Akhil Bharatiya Jatav Mahasabha was founded in 1917 under the leadership of Manik Chand Jatav and Swami Achootanand. It was formed to promote the interests of Jatav for seeking social upliftment into Kshatriya varna.

Foundation 
Manik Chand Jatav, Ramnarayan Yadavendu and others came in contact with each other in 1910s. They worked for the upliftment of leather worker & freeing caste from this disgraceful name. They campaigned for the adopting 'Jatav' surname replacing with names who denotes lower hierarchy.

The name 'Jatav' came from Pandit Sunderlal Sagar's book Jatav Jivan and Ramnarayan Yadavendu's Yaduvansh Ka Itihas, who were based on their similar heritage and clans of Yadavs and Jats of Braj region. They demanded the status of  Kshatriyas and economic prosperity made many Jatavs equal to these middle castes. British government established cantonments in Agra, Delhi, Meerut, Kanpur and other prominent cities which gave Jatavs opportunity to prove themselves they got tenders for making leather products for British Indian Army, and many Jatavs got included into army also. This change created an impact on local Jatavs and they starter organising under one umbrella.

In 1931 census, they played an aggressive role for their demand as inclusion of Jatavs into Kshatriya fold and renaming them as 'Jatav' from Chamar. They succeeded and Chanwar Chamar were called 'Jatav' in new census of India.

Activities 
Jatavs encouraged to leave non-veg and lifestyle as upper castes and even few of them adopted 'sacred thread' who were earlier under the influence of Arya Samaj.

They established many schools, promoted sanskrit, investment in business and women empowerment.

Key people 

 Khemchand Bohare 
Ramnarayan Yadavendu 
 Swami Prabhutanand Vyas
 Pandit Sundarlal Sagar 
 R.P. Deshmukh
 Gopichandra Pipal

References 

Ethnic organisations based in India
Indian caste movements
1917 establishments in India